Eleftherios Papasymeon was a Greek athlete.  He competed at the 1896 Summer Olympics in Athens. Papasimeon was one of 17 athletes to start the marathon race.  He finished fifth of the nine athletes to have completed the race.

References

External links

Year of birth missing
Year of death missing
Greek male marathon runners
Greek male long-distance runners
Olympic athletes of Greece
Athletes (track and field) at the 1896 Summer Olympics
19th-century sportsmen